The Tianhou or Mazu Temple is a temple to the Goddess Mazu, the Chinese Goddess of Sea and Patron Deity of fishermen, sailors and any occupations related to sea/ocean. It is located in Xinwu District, Taoyuan City, Taiwan.

History
The area of Xinwu was settled by Mazu-worshipping Fujianese immigrants during the mid-18th century, the Qianlong Era of the Qing dynasty. The Tianhou Temple was established in 1826 (the sixth year of Qing's Daoguang Era), with its location supposedly pointed out by the goddess. Its idol came from the Chaotian Temple in Beigang. The original small mud structure has since been rebuilt or renovated in 1878, 1905, 1957, 1984, and 2002.

The bronze statue of Mazu was erected in 2002. It is protected by smaller statues of Mazu's door gods and guardians Qianliyan and Shunfeng'er. It is the 2nd-tallest statue of Mazu on Taiwan and the 3rd-tallest in the world.

See also
 Qianliyan & Shunfeng'er
 List of Mazu temples around the world
 List of temples in Taiwan
 List of tallest statues

References

Citations

Bibliography
 . &

External links

 .
 Photographs of the statue and temple in 2010 by Josh Fahler

1826 establishments in Taiwan
Religious buildings and structures completed in 1826
Mazu temples in Taiwan
Temples in Taoyuan City